China Eastern Yunnan Airlines, is an airline based in Kunming, Yunnan Province, People's Republic of China. It is the subsidiary of China Eastern Airlines, and was formerly known as China Yunnan Airlines, whose headquarters were on the property of Wujiaba Airport.

History 
Founded in 1992, the airline was based in Kunming Wujiaba International Airport in Yunnan province and operated a fleet of Bombardier CRJ-200, Boeing 737-300 and Boeing 767-300 aircraft before the merger with China Eastern Airlines. China Yunnan Airlines operated mostly domestic flights from Kunming to major Chinese cities and also provided international services to Hong Kong, Singapore, Thailand and Laos.

In 2003, China Yunnan Airlines and China Northwest Airlines merged into China Eastern Airlines, becoming its Yunnan Branch. All the airliners were transferred to China Eastern Airlines and now painted in parent company's livery.

In 2011, Yunnan Branch becoming China Eastern Yunnan Airlines, which was co-founded by China Eastern Airlines and Yunnan Communications Investment & Constructions Group.

Branding and livery

The livery of China Eastern Yunnan Airlines is slightly different from that of China Eastern Airlines. The aircraft livery is consistent with the traditional livery of China Eastern Airlines, but with the text "云南公司" (Yunnan Company) being added after the Chinese and English text of "China Eastern Airlines". After the transition to Kunming Changshui International Airport, China Eastern Airlines Yunnan introduced and painted their aircraft with the Orange or Purple peacock liveries, including Boeing 737-700, Boeing 737-800 and Airbus A330-300.

Previously, the "Green Peacock" logo representing the former China Yunnan Airlines had been added to the front of the aircraft fuselages. Since 2014, China Eastern Yunnan Airlines has successively launched a new livery of China Eastern Airlines, and the original "Green Peacock" pattern has since been removed.

On the afternoon of 1 April 2013, China's 1000th Boeing passenger plane, registered B-5756, landed at Kunming Changshui International Airport and settled in with China Eastern Yunnan Airlines. The fuselage of the plane was painted with the purple peacock livery, and the words "1000TH BOEING AIRPLANE FOR CHINA" was specially printed on the front of the fuselage.

Fleet

Current 
 

As of November 2019, China Eastern Yunnan Airlines fleet consists of the following aircraft:

Former 

China Eastern Yunnan Airlines and China Yunnan Airlines also previously operated the following aircraft:

Accidents and incidents 
 On 21 November 2004, China Eastern Airlines Flight 5210, a Bombardier CRJ-200LR, crashed shortly after takeoff from Baotou Airport due to wing icing, killing all 53 on board and two people on the ground.
 From 31 March 2008  to 1 April 2008, 21 flights of Yunnan Branch returned unexpectedly due to the dissatisfaction of some pilots with the company's treatment, causing at least 1,500 passengers to be affected by the flight.
 On 21 March 2022, China Eastern Airlines Flight 5735, operated by a Boeing 737-89P (B-1791), crashed during cruise in a dive in Teng County, killing all 132 on board.

References

External links

 China Eastern Yunnan Airlines 
 China Yunnan Airlines  (Archive)
 China Yunnan Airlines  (Archive)

Defunct airlines of China
Airlines established in 1992
Airlines disestablished in 2003
Chinese companies established in 1992
Chinese companies disestablished in 2003